Hajdúszoboszló is a town in Hajdú-Bihar county, Hungary,  southwest of county seat Debrecen. It is the third largest town in Hajdú-Bihar county.

Etymology
The name comes from a Slavic personal name Soběslav (see e.g. Soběslav, Soběslavice, Sebeslavce).

Location
The town is located in the northeastern part of the Great Hungarian Plain. Three regions meet near the town: the Hajdúhát ridge to the north-north-east, the Hortobágy National Park (Puszta) to the north-north-west, and the Great Sárrét and Berettyó region to the south.

This is a landscape "where earth and sky meet", but not a monotonous plain, even for travellers accustomed to romantic mountains, since here and there the landscape is enlivened by the backwaters of the Tisza River with patches of reed, thousands of wild fowl, and inviting groves. The surroundings are the renowned puszta, the "glorious plain".

History

From historical data and archaeological finds, this part of the Great Plain was inhabited as far back as the Great Migrations. Because of the natural resources and the convergence of trade routes, Huns, Vandals, Gepids, Goths, and Avars frequently alternated with one another in this area. Early in the reign of the Árpád Dynasty, the area was inhabited by populous communities. The first written mention of Szoboszló dates back to 1075, when King Géza I donated half of Szoboszló's royal duty taxes to the new abbacy to be established at Garamszentbenedek.

With an ornate deed of gift dated 2 September 1606, István Bocskai, Prince of Transylvania, provided smallholdings for 700 Hajdú (Heyduck) cavalrymen at the site of Szoboszló, which had been destroyed by the Crimean Tartars. Henceforth the prefix Hajdú was attached to the settlement's previous Slavonic name, though the compound form - Hajdúszoboszló - only became widespread in the 19th century. The town led the customary, toilsome life of the small agricultural, stock-breeding towns of Hajdú County until well into the 20th century.

An upswing began on 26 October 1925 with the discovery of the thermal spring in the course of drilling for oil and gas. The medicinal water, tinged with natural iodine, led to the town's development into a resort spa, while agriculture retained its significant role even after the discovery of the gas field.

Population  

1870 - 12,269
1920 - 17,722
1970 - 22,000
2002 - 23,874
2005 - 23,827
2009 - 23,295
2019 - 24,185

Spa complex
The water park includes water slides, an olympic-sized swimming pool, and a wave pool, while the spa features graded thermal pools, including a tepidarium and jacuzzi-type hot baths.

Official website: 
http://hajduszoboszlo.hu/en/

Twin towns – sister cities

Hajdúszoboszló is twinned with:
 Bad Dürrheim, Germany
 Dzierżoniów, Poland
 Kežmarok, Slovakia
 Lanškroun, Czech Republic
 Târnăveni, Romania

References
Notes

External links

  in Hungarian, English, German, Russian, Polish, Slovakian, Romanian and Czech
 hajduszoboszlonoclegi.pl accommodation in Hajduszoboszlo
 vendegzona.hu accommodation in Hajduszoboszlo
 All accommodations in Hajdúszoboszló hajduszoboszlo-szallas.lap.hu
 Great accommodation offers in Hajdúszoboszló www.szallasmagyarorszag.hu
 Hajdúszoboszló at funiq.hu

Populated places in Hajdú-Bihar County
Thermal baths in Hungary
Spa towns in Hungary